Pristimantis rhodoplichus, also known as the Canchaque robber frog, is a species of frog in the family Strabomantidae. It is found in the Andes of southern Ecuador (Zamora-Chinchipe Province) and northern Peru (Department of Piura). The specific name rhodoplichus, from the Greek rhodon (=rose or red) and plichas (meaning inside of the thigh), refers to the rose-red color of the hidden surfaces of its thighs.

Description
Adult males measure  and adult females  in snout–vent length. The snout is subacuminate in dorsal view and rounded in lateral view. The tympanum is distinct. The fingers have lateral keels and elliptical terminal pads. The toes have lateral fringes and terminal pads that are slightly smaller than those on the fingers. Dorsal skin is coarsely shagreened with scattered low, round to subconical tubercles. Dorsal coloration varies from reddish tan to dark brown, possibly with pale dorsolateral stripes. The inguinal region and the hidden surfaces of the thighs are rose-red. The venter varies from dull white to beige to bronze to brown. Males have a large subgular vocal sac.

Habitat and conservation
Individuals have been found at night on low vegetation, and under ground cover by day. It breeds by direct development (i.e., there is no free-living larval stage). It is not known if it can survive in degraded areas. It is threatened by habitat loss (deforestation) caused by agriculture (mostly livestock farming) and selective wood extraction. It is known to occur in the Podocarpus National Park and Tapichala Biological Reserve, both in Ecuador.

References

rhodoplichus
Amphibians of the Andes
Amphibians of Ecuador
Amphibians of Peru
Amphibians described in 1993
Taxa named by William Edward Duellman
Taxonomy articles created by Polbot